The Violin is a 2005 Mexican drama film directed by Francisco Vargas. It was screened in the Un Certain Regard section at the 2006 Cannes Film Festival.

Cast
 Ángel Tavira as Don Plutarco
 Gerardo Taracena as Genaro
 Dagoberto Gama as Capitán
 Mario Garibaldi as Lucio
 Fermín Martínez as Teniente
 Silverio Palacios as Comandante Cayetano
 Octavio Castro as Zacarías
 Mercedes Hernández as Jacinta
 Gerardo Juárez as Pedro
 Ángeles Cruz as Jefa Guerrilera 1
 Norma Pablo as Jefa Guerrilllera 2
 Ariel Galvan as Joaquín
 Amorita Rasgado as Prostitutas
 María Elena Olivares as Doña Lupe
 Esteban Castellanos as Manuel

Awards
The film won the Grand Prize in 2007 at the Miami International Film Festival. At the 2006 Cannes Film Festival, Ángel Tavira won the award for Best Male Performance (Prix d'Interprétation Masculine Un Certain Regard). It also received three Ariel Awards from the Mexican Academy of Film Arts and Sciences.

References

External links

2005 films
2005 drama films
Mexican drama films
2000s Spanish-language films
Mexican black-and-white films
Films about violins and violinists
2000s Mexican films